Durham Township may refer to the following places in the United States:

 Durham Township, Washington County, Arkansas
 Durham Township, Hancock County, Illinois
 Durham Township, Durham County, North Carolina
 Durham Township, Bucks County, Pennsylvania

See also 
 Durham (disambiguation)
 Durham Park Township, Marion County, Kansas
 New Durham Township, LaPorte County, Indiana

Township name disambiguation pages